Rose of the World is a lost 1918 American silent drama film produced by Famous Players-Lasky and distributed by  Artcraft Pictures, an affiliate of Paramount Pictures. It is based on the novels of Agnes and Egerton Castle. The film was directed by Maurice Tourneur and stars Elsie Ferguson.

It is no relation to the 1925 Warner Brothers film of the same name which is based upon a different novel.

Plot
As described in a film magazine, Captain Harry English (Standing) is reported to have been killed during a battle between factions in India and his wife Rosamond (Ferguson) remarries. As time passes Rosamond finds that her love for her deceased husband is greater than her love for the older man that she has married, Sir Arthur Gerardine (Handyside). She goes to live at Harry's old house and there breaks down and tells her husband the truth. She becomes ill and in her ravings asks for Harry. Harry, who was not killed, learns that his wife has remarried and, disguised as an Indian, becomes secretary to Rosamond's husband. He comes to her at a peak psychological moment and, after the shock wears off, they are reunited.

Cast

References

External links

Rose of the World; allmovie.com / synopsis
Lantern slide
 Castle, Agnes and Egerton (1905 ed.), Rose of the World, New York: Frederick A. Stokes Company, on the Internet Archive

1918 films
American silent feature films
Films directed by Maurice Tourneur
Films based on British novels
Lost American films
Famous Players-Lasky films
1918 drama films
Silent American drama films
American black-and-white films
1918 lost films
Lost drama films
1910s American films
1910s English-language films